People's Republican Union is a political party in Benin led by Bamênou Michel Toko. URP was legally recognized on October 10, 1990.

Political parties in Benin